Superagüi National Park is a national park on the coast of the state of Paraná, Brazil.

Location 

Superagüi National Park was declared a Biosphere Reservation by UNESCO in 1991. In 1999, the park was declared a World Heritage Site. The park has bays, deserted beaches, sandbanks, estuaries, mangroves and abundant Atlantic Forest formations. The park is the primary habitat of the critically endangered Superagui Lion Tamarin, and hosts many other fauna and flora characteristic of the Serra do Mar subregion of the Atlantic Forest.

The conservation unit is part of the Lagamar Mosaic.

History 
Evidence indicates that the area has been occupied by fishermen since time immemorial. Prior to the arrival of Europeans it was inhabited by Carijós and Tupiniquins Indians. The Portuguese settled in the area from 1500 on, did not build cities.

In 1852, the Swiss consul in Rio de Janeiro, Perret Gentil, founded Supeargüi Island, one of the first European colonies in the state of Paraná, however, the colony didn't grow, and today the few villages that are within the park have only a few inhabitants, fishermen heirs of the 15 families brought by the consul to live in Superagui Island.

References

Bibliography

External links 
 ParksWatch: profile of Superagüi NP

National parks of Brazil
Protected areas of Paraná (state)
Protected areas of the Atlantic Forest